Serendipita is a fungal genus of the order Sebacinales. It was described in 1993 with Serendipita vermifera (originally Sebacina) as the type species. In 2016, this genus was moved into its own family Serendipitaceae.

References

External links

Sebacinales
Agaricomycetes genera